The Akwa Ibom State House of Assembly is the state legislature of Akwa Ibom State in Nigeria. It is located at Udoudoma Avenue, a business district. The Akwa Ibom State House of Assembly is currently under the People's Democratic Party which is the current party ruling Akwa Ibom State. There have been seven different house of assemblies the very first one was inaugurated 2 October 1998. There are currently 26 members of the House of Assembly, representing one of the various local government areas in Akwa Ibom.

The present speaker of the House of Assembly is Hon. Aniekan Bassey, 
the 7th speaker of the Akwa Ibom State House of Assembly Nigeria.

Aim of Akwa Ibom State House of Assembly 
The purpose of the House of Assembly is to "provide information on the scope of responsibilities, services and commitment for the entire people of Akwa Ibom State". The Akwa Ibom State House of Assembly was created to provide certain services for the good of Akwa Ibomites. Each service has various standards that must be met; whenever the appropriation bill is passed on to the house they must ensure that estimates are critically analysed and resources are distributed in such a way those in need are put in priority. They must also ensure that the money budgeted is efficiently utilized and judiciously spent as intended. When it comes to law making, the House of Assembly must ensure the laws are passed with the positive interest of Akwa Ibomites. The laws must also be practical and implementable over a long period of time. In the case of legitimizing of a political candidate for office the House of Assembly must pick an individual who is well qualified and possesses the skills needed for the position. Members of the public are allowed to express their opinions of this candidate in the House of Assembly form petitions and all these petitions must be read and put into consideration before appointing the candidate for a public office. When members of the public send in petitions to the House of Assembly regarding various issues, the Committee Secretary of the House of Assembly is given a 48-hour limit to respond to these petitions leaving behind his name, position and contact information. Formal petitions will receive responses within two weeks of the day it was issued.

The House of Assembly recognizes that every Akwa Ibomite has the right to peacefully protest, therefore part of the House of Assembly's responsibility is to ensure that the citizens' rights are protected. Furthermore, the House of Assembly is entrusted with the responsibility of overseeing the activities of ministries, departments and agencies (MDA's), through committees. These committees conduct semi-annually and annually inspections on the books of MDA's in order to ensure they are complying with the rules and laws that have been put in place; any defiance of the law is punished accordingly. Lastly, another service they provide is publication of hansards, these are word for word reports of the proceedings in the House of Assembly and they are made available to the general public for a fixed fee.

References 

 
Politics of Akwa Ibom State
State legislatures of Nigeria
State lower houses in Nigeria